Hathras Road railway station is a small railway station in Hathras district, Uttar Pradesh with the station code HTJ. The station consists of a single platform and lacks many facilities including water, sanitation, and shelter.

About

Hathras Road railway station is a two platform station located in Hathras district, Uttar Pradesh, serving Hathras City. Its code is HTJ. From this station it is 9 km east to Hathras City railway station and 9 km south to Hathras Kila (Fort) railway station.

See also
 Hathras City railway station
 Hathras Kila railway station
 Hathras Junction railway station
 Kasganj Junction railway station
 Mathura Junction

References

External links

Railway junction stations in India
Railway stations in Hathras district
Allahabad railway division
Hathras